Impatiens pritzelii is a species of plant in the family Balsaminaceae. It is endemic to China.

References

Endemic flora of China
pritzelii
Endangered plants
Taxonomy articles created by Polbot